Papillary stenosis is a disturbance of the sphincter of Oddi, a muscular valve, that prevents the opening and release of bile or pancreatic fluids into the duodenum in response to food entering the duodenum.

Obstruction of the valve can cause:
 pancreatic pain
 jaundice - bile leaking back into the blood stream.
 attacks of pancreatitis

Causes
 passage of stones
 scarring
 Gluten-sensitive enteropathy
 Autoimmune pancreatitis

Diagnosis and treatment
 Endoscopic examination
 Usually treated surgically, usually involving papillotomy, that is, an incision in the sphincter.

See also

Sphincter of Oddi dysfunction

External links
 Papillary Stenosis: Sphincter of Oddi Dysfunction

References

Biliary tract disorders